= Babrantium =

Coordinates: 38°25′23″N 26°07′48″E

Babrantium or Babrantion (Ancient Greek: Βαβράντιον) was a town of ancient Greece on the island of Chios.

Its site is located near modern Daskalopetra.
